Wisconsin is a state located in the Midwestern United States. As of January 1, 2021, there were 190 cities in Wisconsin, and 1,883 municipalities.

List of cities

Gallery

Fictional
 Deerlaken, Wisconsin, the setting of Irresistible
 Point Place, Wisconsin, the setting of That '70s Show
 Stillwell, Wisconsin, the setting of novels by Milton K. Ozaki
 Willows, Wisconsin, the home of Barbie

See also 
 List of municipalities in Wisconsin by population
 List of towns in Wisconsin
 List of villages in Wisconsin
 Political subdivisions of Wisconsin

References

External links 

 League of Wisconsin Municipalities. Estimated Population per Square Mile of Land Area, Wisconsin Municipalities 
 Wisconsin Department of Administration. List of Wisconsin municipalities in alphabetical order
 Wisconsin Department of Health Services. Wisconsin Cities, Villages, Townships and Unincorporated Places Listing
 Wisconsin Legislative Reference Bureau. State of Wisconsin Blue Book 2013-2014 - state and local government statistics

 


 
Wisconsin, List of cities in
Cities